The Assumption of the Virgin, 1475–1476, is a large (228.6 x 377.2 cm) painting in tempera on wood panel by Francesco Botticini. It portrays Mary's assumption and was commissioned as the altarpiece for a church in Florence and is now in the National Gallery, London.

The disciples gather around Mary's lily-filled tomb with looks of amazement. There are donor portraits of Matteo Palmieri, who commissioned the work, kneeling on the left, and his wife on the right. In Heaven above, surrounded by the nine choirs of angels, Jesus raises his hand in blessing to his kneeling mother.

Among the lesser angels around Jesus and Mary are saints. Together with Palmieri's poem La città di vita, this mixing of saints with angels raised questions about the orthodoxy of the donor Palmieri, and possibly that of the painter Botticini himself.

See also
Assumption of the Virgin Mary in art
Marian art in the Catholic Church

Further reading
 History of Painting in Italy by Crowe, Joseph Archer and Giovanni Battista Cavalcaselle
 Descriptive and historical catalogue of the pictures in the National Gallery: with biographical notices of the painters - Foreign schools; National Gallery, 1906

References

Italian paintings
Paintings depicting Jesus
Botticini
Angels in art
Collections of the National Gallery, London
1476 paintings